Oliver Mark (born 20 February 1963) is a German photographer and artist known primarily for his portraits of international celebrities.

Life and education 
Mark trained as a photographer, working first in the field of fashion photography at Burda Photo Studios in Offenburg. As a guest student, he attended seminars in Visual Culture at the Berlin University of the Arts by Katharina Sieverding, known for her large format photographs.

Mark is the father of two sons and lives in Berlin.

Work 

In the 1990s, Mark began photographing celebrities. He became known for his portraits of Anthony Hopkins and Jerry Lewis, but also of other public figures including Angela Merkel, Pope Benedict XVI, and Joachim Gauck, and actors like Ben Kingsley, Cate Blanchett and Tom Hanks. His personal interest lies in contemporary artists and their creative world. He has close contacts with well-established and emerging artists, who he portrays in their working environment.

He works with both a single-lens reflex camera and an old, 680 Polaroid. The instant photos produced by the Polaroid reveal Mark's familiarity and closeness to the subjects he portrays.

He has worked for magazines such as Architectural Digest, Rolling Stone, Der Spiegel, Süddeutsche Zeitung Magazin, Stern, Time, Vanity Fair, Vogue and Die Zeit.

Exhibitions

Solo exhibitions 
 2002/03: Portraits, Mougins Center of Photography, Mougins
 2011: 7 Artists and 1 Nude, Galerie Gloria, Berlin
 2011: Portraits, Neuer Pfaffenhofener Kunstverein, Pfaffenhofen a. d. Ilm
 2012/13: Märkische Adlige – eine Bilanz nach 20 Jahren, Potsdam
 2013: Heimat verpflichtet, Kanzlei im Lübbenauer Schlossbezirk, Lübbenau
 2013: Oliver Marks Blick auf Liechtensteins Staatsfeiertag am 15 August 2012, Liechtenstein National Museum, Vaduz
 2014: Oliver Mark – still...lesen, Goethe-Institut Irland, Dublin
 2014: Märkische Adlige – eine Bilanz des Neuanfangs, Fürst-Pückler-Museum, Cottbus
 2014: Aus den Trümmern kriecht das Leben – Portraits von Karl Otto Götz, Kunstsammlungen Chemnitz
 2016/17: Natura Morta, Liechtenstein National Museum, Vaduz
 2017: Natura Morta, Natural History Museum Vienna
 2017: Natura Morta, Fotografien von Oliver Mark in Korrespondenz zu Stillleben-Gemälden der Sammlung, The Paintings Gallery of the Academy of Fine Arts Vienna
 2018: Life at the Bukovina Monastery, Bukovina Museum Suceava, Romania
 2019: Life at the Bukovina Monastery, Liechtenstein National Museum, Vaduz
 2019: No Show, Villa Dessauer – Museen der Stadt Bamberg
 2019/20: Golden Shoes – Photographs from the Collection of the Liechtenstein National Museum by Oliver Mark
 2019/20: Life at the Bukovina Monastery, St. Thomas von Aquin Church
 2020: Jenny Holzer's Hands in the Peter and Paul Church, Potsdam

Natura Morta 
Mark's exhibition Natura Morta, which was presented in two parts at the Paintings Gallery of the Academy of Fine Arts Vienna and the Natural History Museum Vienna in 2017, addresses how humans deal with nature and the environment, in particular the animal world, but also the aesthetics and beauty death. Mark's still life photographs were taken in the Asservat Chamber of the Federal Office for Nature Conservation in Bonn in 2015. His idea was to photograph items seized by customs, such as leopard skulls, ivory carvings, crocodile and turtle products, protected animal and plant parts, etc. He photographed these using specific backgrounds and a method of lighting (Old Master-like daylight, lit only through a crack) to generate in the viewer a desire to observe. In the Vienna Natural History Museum, these items are sorted into three categories and exhibited in context with different animal specimens, to address the topic of species protection. The photographs were presented in historical picture frames. This created a dialog in the Paintings Gallery of the Vienna Academy of Fine Arts between the different genres of painting and photography as well as the painted or photographed still lifes.

Publications 
 Portraits. Hatje Cantz, Berlin 2009, .
 With Martina Schellhorn: Heimat verpflichtet. Märkische Adlige – eine Bilanz nach 20 Jahren. Brandenburgische Landeszentrale für politische Bildung, Potsdam 2012, .
 Oliver Marks Blick auf Liechtensteins Staatsfeiertag. Alpenland, Schaan 2013, .
 Außenseiter und Eingeweihter. [Outsider and Insider] Hatje Cantz, Berlin 2013, .
 Aus den Trümmern kriecht das Leben. [From the rubble crawls life] b.frank books, Zürich 2013, . (with poems by K. O. Götz)
 Oliver – Nutte Künstler Fotograf. Die ganze Wahrheit über Oliver Mark. [Oliver – hooker artist photographer. The whole truth about Oliver Mark] Grauel, Berlin 2014.
 Natura Morta. Kehrer, Heidelberg 2016, . (with texts by Barbara Hendricks, Rainer Vollkommer, Philipp Demandt, Julia M. Nauhaus, Michael Schipper, Aurelia Frick, Christian Köberl, Lorenz Becker)
 Bucovina Monastery Life. Liechtensteinisches Landesmuseum, 2018, .  (with texts by Rainer Vollkommer, Constantin-Emil Ursu, Teodor Brădăţanu)
 No Show. Distanz, Berlin 2019, . (with texts by Carolin Hilker-Möll, Christoph Peters, Georg Maria Roers SJ, Michael Schipper)

Collections 
Mark's work is held in the following permanent collections
Kunstsammlungen Chemnitz
Würth Collection
Bukovina Museum, Suceava, Romania

Gallery

See also 
 Portrait photography

References

External links 

 
 "Oliver Mark at the Lindenau-Museum" In: clairbykahn.com
 Interview: "Oliver Mark's Astounding Portraits of Your Favorite Artists" In: noisey.vice.com
 Article about the "Taylor Wessing Photographic Portrait Prize 2013" In: justaddpictures.com
 

1963 births
20th-century German artists
20th-century German photographers
21st-century German artists
21st-century German photographers
Berlin University of the Arts alumni
Fashion photographers
German contemporary artists
Living people
People from Gelsenkirchen
German photographers
Photographers from Berlin
Portrait photographers